2,5-Dimethoxy-4-chloroamphetamine (DOC) is a psychedelic drug of the phenethylamine and amphetamine chemical classes. It was presumably first synthesized by Alexander Shulgin, and was described in his book PiHKAL (Phenethylamines i Have Known And Loved).

Chemistry 

DOC is a substituted alpha-methylated phenethylamine, a class of compounds commonly known as amphetamines. The phenethylamine equivalent (lacking the alpha-methyl group) is 2C-C. DOC has a stereocenter and (R)-(−)-DOC is the more active stereoisomer.

Pharmacology 

DOC acts as a selective 5-HT2A, 5-HT2B, and 5-HT2C receptor partial agonist. Its psychedelic effects are mediated via its actions on the 5-HT2A receptor.

Dosage 

A normal average dose of DOC ranges from 0.5–7.0 mg the former producing threshold effects, and the latter producing extremely strong effects. Onset of the drug is 1–3 hours, peak and plateau at 4–8 hours, and a gradual come down with residual stimulation at 9-20h. After effects can last well into the next day.

Effects 
Unlike simple amphetamines, DOC is considered a chemical that influences cognitive and perception processes of the brain. The strongest supposed effects include open and closed eye visuals, increased awareness of sound and movement, and euphoria. In the autobiography PiHKAL, Alexander Shulgin included a description of DOC as "an archetypal psychedelic" (#64); its presumed full-range visual, audio, physical, and mental effects show exhilarating clarity, and some overwhelming, humbling, and "composting"/interweaving effects.

Dangers 

Very little data exists about the toxicity of DOC. In April 2013, a case of death due to DOC was reported. The source does not specify whether the drug alone caused the death. In 2014, a death was reported in which DOC was directly implicated as the sole causative agent in the death of a user. The autopsy indicated pulmonary edema and a subgaleal hemorrhage.

Detection in biological specimens 
DOC may be quantitated in blood, plasma or urine by gas chromatography-mass spectrometry or liquid chromatography-mass spectrometry to confirm a diagnosis of poisoning in hospitalized patients or to provide evidence in a medicolegal death investigation. Blood or plasma DOC concentrations are expected to be in a range of 1–10 μg/L in persons using the drug recreationally, >20 μg/L in intoxicated patients and >100 μg/L in victims of acute overdosage.

Popularity 

Although rare on the black market, it has been available in bulk and shipped worldwide by select elite "Grey Market" Research Chemical suppliers for several years. Sales of DOC on blotting paper and in capsules was reported in late 2005 and again in late 2007. According to the DEA's Microgram from December 2007, the Concord Police Department in Contra Costa County, California, in the US, seized "a small piece of crudely lined white blotter paper without any design, suspected LSD 'blotter acid'". They added "Unusually, the paper appeared to be hand-lined using two pens, in squares measuring approximately 6 x 6 millimeters. The paper displayed fluorescence when irradiated at 365 nanometers; however, color testing for LSD with para-dimethylaminobenzaldehyde (Ehrlich's reagent) was negative. Analysis of a methanol extract by GC/MS indicated not LSD but rather DOC (not quantitated but a high loading based on the TIC)". DOC is sometimes misrepresented as LSD by unscrupulous dealers. This is particularly dangerous, as DOC is not known to have the safety profile of LSD. It can be particularly unsafe, in comparison to LSD, for those suffering from hypertension, as amphetamine compounds are known to cause sharp increases in systolic blood pressure.

Drug prohibition laws

Canada
Listed as a Schedule 1 as it is an analogue of amphetamine. The CDSA was updated as a result of the Safe Streets Act changing amphetamines from Schedule 3 to Schedule 1.

Australia
Unscheduled but can be controlled as schedule II as an analogue of DOB.

China
As of October 2015 DOC is a controlled substance in China.

New Zealand
Scheduled.

Denmark
Denmark added DOC to the list of Schedule I controlled substances as of 8.4.2007.

Germany
Scheduled in Anlage I since 22.1.2010.

Sweden
Sveriges riksdag added DOC to schedule I ("substances, plant materials and fungi which normally do not have medical use") as narcotics in Sweden as of Aug 30, 2007,  published by Medical Products Agency in their regulation LVFS 2007:10 listed as DOC, 4-klor-2,5-dimetoxi-amfetamin.
DOC was first classified by Sveriges riksdags health ministry Statens folkhälsoinstitut as "health hazard" under the act Lagen om förbud mot vissa hälsofarliga varor (translated Act on the Prohibition of Certain Goods Dangerous to Health) as of Jul 1, 2004,  in their regulation SFS 2004:486 listed as 4-klor-2,5-dimetoxiamfetamin (DOC).

United Kingdom
Class A.

United States
DOC is not scheduled or controlled at the federal level in the United States, but the Department of Justice considers it to be an analogue of DOB and, as such, possession or sale could be prosecuted under the Federal Analogue Act. In the United States, the analogues DMA, DOB, and DOM are Schedule I controlled substances.

US State of Florida
DOC is a Schedule I controlled substance in the state of Florida making it illegal to buy, sell, or possess.

United Nations
In December 2019, the UNODC announced scheduling recommendations placing DOC into Schedule I alongside another several research chemicals.

See also 
 2,5-Dimethoxy-4-Substituted Amphetamines
 DODC
 ZDCM-04

References

External links 
 DOC Entry in PiHKAL
 DOC Entry in PiHKAL info
 Erowid DOC Vault

Substituted amphetamines
Chlorobenzenes
2,5-Dimethoxyphenethylamines
Designer drugs